The River City Jaguars were a USA Hockey-sanctioned Tier III Junior A ice hockey team playing in the Northern Pacific Hockey League (NorPac).

History
The franchise joined the NorPac in 2004 when the league was a Jr. B league. They originally played at Valley Ice Arena in Beaverton, Oregon. In 2007 the league and member teams were granted Tier III Jr. A status by USA Hockey, the governing body for ice hockey in the United States. 

In 2010, the Jaguars began playing out of the Mountain View Ice Arena in Vancouver, Washington.  After one season in Vancouver, the Jaguars were renamed and became the Vancouver Victory. The next season the Victory renamed again to Vancouver Vipers and then in 2013 became the Fort Vancouver Vipers.

On October 14, 2014, the Fort Vancouver Vipers Hockey Club ceased all operations due to an insufficient number of players and a recent increase in player injuries.

Alumni
The NorPac was for 16 to 20-year-old player development in a professional environment while maintaining their amateur status for college eligibility. The Jaguars franchise has had a number of alumni move on to collegiate programs and higher levels of junior ice hockey in the United States and Canada.

On November 27, 2005, Jaguars player, Jonathan Medina from California, died in an accident. In honor of Medina, the Jaguars retired his jersey and number.
 
On April 13, 2010, the franchise saw its first alumnus sign with an NHL team when Jake Newton signed a three-year entry level contract with the Anaheim Ducks.

Team affiliates
The River City Jaguars had been affiliated with the Tier II Alaska Avalanche of the North American Hockey League and the Tier I Tri-City Storm of the United States Hockey League to further player growth and development.

In 2012, the Vancouver Vipers affiliated with the Canadian Junior A Coquitlam Express of the British Columbia Hockey League which they maintained until ceasing operations in 2014.

References

External links
 Vipers Website
 Northern Pacific Hockey League Website

Ice hockey teams in Washington (state)
Sports in Vancouver, Washington
2004 establishments in Oregon
Ice hockey teams in Oregon
Beaverton, Oregon
Sports in the Portland metropolitan area
2014 disestablishments in Washington (state)
Ice hockey clubs established in 2004
Ice hockey clubs disestablished in 2014